Praydidae is a family of false ermine moths in the superfamily Yponomeutoidea. Though once considered a subfamily (Praydinae), a 2013 molecular analysis elevated it to family rank.

Genera
Atemelia Herrich-Schäffer, 1853
Dictyoprays J.C. Sohn, 2012
Distagmos Herrich-Schäffer, 1853
Eucatagma Busck, 1900
Prays Hübner, [1825]

References

 , 2012: A new genus and species of Praydidae (Lepidoptera: Yponomeutoidea) from Vietnam. Tinea 22 (2): 120-124.
  & , 2014: A New Species of Atemelia (Lepidoptera, Yponomeutoidea, Praydidae) Feeding on the Ornamental Shrub Mahonia (Ranunculales: Berberidaceae) in Chile. Annals of the Entomological Society of America, 107 (2): 339-346.
 , 2012: Catalogue of the type specimens of Yponomeutoidea (Lepidoptera) in the collection of the United States National Museum of Natural History. Zootaxa 3573: 1-17. Abstract: .

Moth families
Yponomeutoidea